Canarsie High School, which opened in 1964, is a defunct public high school in the Brooklyn neighborhood of Canarsie in New York City. Closed in 2011, the building currently operates as Canarsie Educational Campus, housing several smaller high schools.

Closing
Under the Impact Schools initiative in 2004, Canarsie High School received increased police and security presence. In 2007, it was announced Canarsie would close because it "was in such disarray that the only way to fix it would be to shut it down, replacing it with several smaller schools on the same campus. The school had received the lowest possible grades (F and U) under the Department of Education's first citywide progress reports. This was part of a trend in the city beginning in the 1990s and embraced by the administration of then-Mayor Michael Bloomberg to convert failing large high schools into educational campuses. For the 2007-2008 academic year, the school stopped admitting new students. Canarsie High School graduated 40 percent of its final class of 358 students in the Spring of 2011.

Student demographics
84.51% Black or African American, 11.47% Hispanic or Latino, 2.07% White non-Hispanic, 1.66% Asian and 0.28% Native American. The student/teacher ratio is 22.0. The school is part of School District #18.

Current schools
Three schools, High School for Innovation in Advertising and Media, High School for Medical Professions, and Urban Action Academy, are currently operating in the Canarsie campus.

Notable alumni
 Ill Bill, Hip-Hop artist from Canarsie
 Warren Cuccurullo, pop and rock guitarist
 Mark "Prince Markie Dee" Morales, rapper (The Fat Boys and solo), producer, songwriter,radio personality, actor
 World B. Free, NBA basketball player
 Alan Edelman, mathematician, computer scientist, co-creator of the Julia programming language
 Geoff Huston-NBA player
Randy Katz, computer scientist
 Karl Kani, fashion designer 
Dan Morogiello, major league baseball player
 Arlie Petters, mathematical physicist
 John "Spider" Salley, NBA basketball player and talk show host
 Lance Schulters NFL player
 Howard Schultz, Chairman and CEO of Starbucks Corporation and a former owner of the Seattle SuperSonics.
 Curtis Sliwa, Guardian Angels founder and radio talk show host, 2021 mayoral candidate for New York City
 Stuart Sternberg, owner of the Tampa Bay Rays
 Clarence Taylor
 Taxstone, podcast host and Twitter personality
 Leon Williams, NFL player
Evan Seinfield, actor, singer

References
Notes

Defunct high schools in Brooklyn
Educational institutions in the United States with year of establishment missing
Canarsie, Brooklyn
Public high schools in Brooklyn
Educational institutions disestablished in 2011
2011 disestablishments in New York (state)